Zohab or Zehab or Zahab may refer to:

 Zohab, Hormozgan, Hormozgan Province, Iran
 Zohab, Chenaran, Razavi Khorasan Province, Iran
 Zehab, Fariman, Razavi Khorasan Province, Iran
 Zahab-e Olya, South Khorasan Province, Iran